James Oswald Young (28 June 1913 – 7 March 1994) was a South African cricketer who played first-class cricket for Eastern Province from 1936 to 1953.

In 1947-48, in his first match as Eastern Province captain, Young scored one of the fastest centuries in South African cricket, against Orange Free State. Going to the wicket on the first day of the match with the score at 48 for 6, he reached 100 in 62 minutes, and finished on 110 not out in a total of 196. Eastern Province won by 60 runs. He later captained Eastern Province in 1949-50, 1950–51 and 1952–53, his last season, when he also took his best bowling figures, 5 for 35, in another victory over Orange Free State.

References

External links
 James Young at CricketArchive
 James Young at Cricinfo

1913 births
1994 deaths
Cricketers from Port Elizabeth
South African cricketers
Eastern Province cricketers